William Hughes-Hughes D.L. (1817 – 7 January 1902) was a barrister and founding member of The Philatelic Society, London.

Early life
He was educated at Tonbridge School.

Hughes-Hughes matriculated at Christ Church, Oxford, in 1835, graduating B.A. in 1839 and M.A in 1841. He had entered Lincoln's Inn in 1838, and was called to the bar there in 1842.

Career
Hughes-Hughes was a barrister by profession. Later he was a justice of the peace.

Philately
Hughes-Hughes was a founding member of The Philatelic Society, London. which subsequently became the Royal Philatelic Society London, and one of the small group who met regularly at the Rev. Stainforth's Rectory before that society was formed.

He was reported to have become a collector in 1859 and ceased in 1874 having spent £69. His collection was then sold by Stanley Gibbons for £3,000 in 1896. It included a number of rarities:

British Guiana 1856 4 cents on blue "sugar" paper
Canada 12d black
One of the four unused Great Britain Penny Red plate 77 (subsequently sold to Herbert L'Estrange Ewen who sold it to Henry J. Crocker, and believed destroyed in the 1906 San Francisco earthquake or the fire that followed.)
Cape of Good Hope 4d red Woodblock error of colour (Reckoned to be rarer than a Post Office Mauritius)
Reunion 1852 15c
Naples 1860 ½ tornese in both types.

Death
Hughes-Hughes died on 7 January 1902.

Family
Hughes-Hughes married in 1845 Ellen Oldham, daughter of Joseph Oldham of Stamford Hill. Their children included:

Montague Edward Hughes-Hughes (born 1853), F.S.A. and a member of the Royal Philatelic Society London
August Hughes-Hughes (born 1857), assistant in the British Museum 
Arthur Lindsay Hughes-Hughes (born 1859), R.N.

References

Further reading
Biography in The Biographical Magazine, October 1898.

British philatelists
1817 births
1902 deaths
People educated at Tonbridge School
Alumni of Christ Church, Oxford
British barristers
English justices of the peace